Saint-Loup-Géanges is a commune in the Saône-et-Loire department in the region of Bourgogne-Franche-Comté in eastern France.

Formerly known as Saint-Loup-de-la-Salle, the village was merged with the village of Géanges of January 1, 1973 and its name was changed to Saint-Loup-Géanges.

See also
Communes of the Saône-et-Loire department

References

Communes of Saône-et-Loire